David Singeoi Kiptoo (born 25 June 1967 in Kapsabet) is a retired Kenyan athlete who competed mostly in the 800 metres. He represented his country at the 1996 Summer Olympics finishing second in the final.

His personal bests in the event are 1:43.00 outdoors (1996) and 1:46.05 indoors (1999).

Competition record

References

1967 births
Living people
Kenyan male middle-distance runners
Olympic athletes of Kenya
Athletes (track and field) at the 1996 Summer Olympics
Goodwill Games medalists in athletics
People from Nandi County
Competitors at the 1998 Goodwill Games
20th-century Kenyan people